Gregorio del Pilar, officially the Municipality of Gregorio del Pilar is a 5th class municipality in the province of Ilocos Sur, Philippines. According to the 2020 census, it has a population of 4,472 people.

Formerly named Concepcion (in honor of its patron saint, Nuestra Senora de Concepcion), it was renamed after general Gregorio del Pilar by virtue of Republic Act No. 1246 on June 10, 1955, sponsored by Congressman Ricardo Gacula. The municipality was the site of the Battle of Tirad Pass where General del Pilar fought to the death against the Americans.

Etymology
The town got its name after general Gregorio del Pilar.

History

Battle of Tirad Pass

On December 2, 1899, American forces, mostly of the 33rd Volunteer Infantry Regiment under Major Peyton C. March, prepared for an assault of the Filipino forces fortification under the Command of General Gregorio del Pilar. On the narrow trail of Tirad Pass, the Filipino soldiers watched as the enemy began to move up the trail. On around a few hundreds yards above the pass, General Gregorio del Pilar, with his staff and accompanied by two civilians from Sitio Mabatano, spotted the American forces through his spy glass as they were starting to move. But as he watched, he noticed that the American forces broke formation and instead sent a messenger on horse back with a white banner. As the messenger was coming near the fortification of Filipino forces, the sound of a gun was heard and the messenger fell. The American forces divided into three separate groups. One group followed the trail towards the pass.

Another group ascended the hill facing the Filipino soldiers stationed in the pass. The third group, led by a Filipino from the lowlands named Januario Galut, made their way up unnoticed through the old trail which was hastily barricaded by felled trees a few days before the American forces arrived. This old path lead to the place where General del Pilar stood watching. As the American forces dispersed, the general ordered the two civilians, Tucdaden and Abeng to proceed to the trenches and deliver the breakfast of the Filipino soldiers. All of a sudden continuous gunshots were heard continuously and went unabated for several hours. General del Pilar was shot and killed.

Geography
The town lies among the western hills of the Cordilleras in the interior eastern portion of the province of Ilocos Sur. It is bounded in the north by the town of San Emilio, Quirino in the east, Sigay in the south and Salcedo in the west. Its 7 barangays and sitios are connected by winding foot trails and seasonal rugged roads. The town is likewise endowed with natural scenery and wonders such as the payoh or rice terraces, pristine waterfalls, and the distinctive peak of Mount Tirad. There are also trails crisscrossing Tirad Pass, which were built through polo y servicio (forced labor) during the Spanish Period.

Barangays
Gregorio del Pilar is politically subdivided into 7 barangays. These barangays are headed by elected officials: Barangay Captain, Barangay Council, whose members are called Barangay Councilors. All are elected every three years.

 Alfonso (Tangaoan)
 Bussot
 Concepcion
 Dapdappig (Mabatano)
 Matue-Butarag
 Poblacion Norte
 Poblacion Sur

Sitios
Gregorio del Pilar is politically subdivided into 5 sitios.

 Mabatano
 Tangaoan
 Ul-oling
 Tubalina
 Butarag

Climate

Demographics

In the 2020 census, Gregorio del Pilar had a population of 4,472.

The inhabitants are Igorots, but belong to the Bag-o ethno-linguistic group. This mixture of Ilocano and Igorot intermarriages speak the Kankanaey language but can speak and understand the dialects of their neighboring towns. Many have already acquired college education and some serve the government and private institutions.

Economy

Government
Gregorio del Pilar, belonging to the second congressional district of the province of Ilocos Sur, is governed by a mayor designated as its local chief executive and by a municipal council as its legislative body in accordance with the Local Government Code. The mayor, vice mayor, and the councilors are elected directly by the people through an election which is being held every three years.

Elected officials

Tourist attractions

Tirad Pass National Park and Shrine of Gen. Gregorio del Pilar (Barangay Dapdappig)
Sibol Hot Spring and Swimming area (Barangay Bussot)
Mt. Tirad Pass Summit and Mt. Peg-an Camping site (Barangay Bussot)
Tirad Pass Museum and handicraft center (Poblacion Sur)

See also
List of renamed cities and municipalities in the Philippines

References

External links
Act renaming the town of Concepcion to Gregorio del Pilar
Pasyalang Ilocos Sur
Philippine Standard Geographic Code
Philippine Census Information
Local Governance Performance Management System 

Municipalities of Ilocos Sur